is a fictional character in the Castlevania video game series.

Concept and creation

Castlevania: Symphony of the Night contains unused content that suggests an evil or possessed version of Maria was planned to be included. Her theme remix in Castlevania Judgment was designed to evoke Maria's "energetic and innocent" personality. Composer Yasushi Asada opted to utilize a nylon string guitar and accordion to try and match this intensity.

Appearances
Maria first appears in Castlevania: Rondo of Blood, as a young girl who is kidnapped by Dracula's forces. If Richter rescues her, she becomes a playable character, attacking with animals.

A now adult Maria appears in a supporting role in Castlevania: Symphony of the Night, where she is investigating Richter's disappearance and the mysterious return of Dracula's Castle. While exploring, she encounters Alucard, and aids him in his own quest. If certain conditions are met, Maria will provide Alucard with the Holy Glasses, which dispel evil illusions. This allows Alucard to see that Richter is being controlled by Shaft when they fight, leading to the second half of the game, and the good ending. If the player does not get the glasses from Maria, they will be forced to kill Richter, leading to the bad ending. In the Japanese- only Sega Saturn, and global PSP and PS4 re-releases, of Symphony of the Night, Maria is made a fully playable character. 

She will appear alongside Richter in the Castlevania: Nocturne animated series, set during the French Revolution.

In 2023, Maria Renard was added as a playable character in a ROM hack of Castlevania: Portrait of Ruin. Also in 2023, a fangame titled Maria Renard's Revenge was released in beta form for the Amiga line of computers.

Reception
Maria Renard has become a fan favorite in the series. Writer Jonathan Oyama referred to Maria as the token shoujo character and suggested that she was added to Rondo of Blood. He called her one of the best characters in Castlevania, although he found the change from her Rondo of Blood design to her Symphony of the Night design disappointing. Writer Ron Duwell felt that Maria was one of the best aspects of Rondo of Blood, calling her "one of the most fun female protagonists" in any video game. Writer Jonathan Ore was critical of Maria, comparing her unfavorably to fellow Castlevania protagonist Shanoa. He took issue with her needing to be rescued and generally being in a more supporting role than Richter.

Maria's design in Castlevania Judgment has received generally negative reception. It was a popular example among fans of the problem with Judgments design. Writer JC Fletcher criticized her design, calling it unrecognizable and called her an "annoying kid in a ridiculous pink Gothic Lolita dress." GamePros McKinley Noble felt that Maria was completely unlike her standard design, which caused the game to feel "generic and ill-planned." Writer Mitch Dyer found her design unrecognizable and was critical of Maria for her obsession with large breasts, calling it immature. Screen Rant writer Chris Hodges also disliked her infatuation, calling it "embarrassing." The cutscene depicting this infatuation with breasts was included in Joystiq's list of the worst cutscenes. They expressed discomfort by this as well as express incredulity that such a scene would occur in the setting of Castlevania Judgment. Destructoid's Jonathan Holmes called her design outrageous, citing her Chun-Li-like thighs, owl wand, and outfit. He bemoaned that she had almost nothing in common with her standard design. Upon playing the game, he was more forgiving of her design, stating that being in her teens makes her "girl-punk accessories" feel more justified. Nintendo World Report writer Zachary Miller called her design "hideous" while comparing her voice to that of an InuYasha character. However, reviewer Andrew Podolsky praised Maria's owl staff and its originality. GameZone and Jeax Video drew comparisons between her Judgment design and Death Note character Misa Amane, who was also designed by Obata.

References

Castlevania characters
Female characters in video games
Fictional vampire hunters
Konami protagonists
Video game characters introduced in 1993
Fictional monster hunters